Heather Hemmens is an American actress, film director, and film producer. She is best known for her role as Alice Verdura in The CW series Hellcats (2010-2011). She starred as Stacy Collins in the Netflix comedy Dad Stop Embarrassing Me! opposite Jamie Foxx and currently stars as Maria DeLuca in the series Roswell, New Mexico, which premiered in January, 2019 on The CW. Previous credits include the OWN series, If Loving You Is Wrong, where she played Marcie Holmes for five seasons.

Early life
Hemmens was raised in the woods of Waldo, Maine with her two older brothers and older sister. Hemmens attended Mount View High School in Thorndike, Maine, before attending the performing arts high school Walnut Hill School for the Arts near Boston for her final two years of high school graduating in 2002. She went to Los Angeles to pursue an acting career upon graduating. She has a black belt in martial arts and weapons training.

Career
In early career, Hemmens had small roles in the films The Dukes of Hazzard (2005) and Glory Road (2006). In addition, Hemmens has also directed and produced the short films Perils of an Active Mind and Designated which were both released in 2010. In 2010, she was cast as Alice Verdura in The CW series Hellcats, a comedy-drama about competitive college cheerleading, executive produced by Tom Welling. The show received mixed reviews, but Hemmens' performance was very positively received by critics, with many referring to Hemmens as the breakout star. The series was canceled after one season in 2011. She also guest starred on CSI: NY, CSI: Miami, Without a Trace, The Haves and the Have Nots, Grey's Anatomy, and The Vampire Diaries.

In 2014, Hemmens was cast as one of leads in the Oprah Winfrey Network prime time soap opera If Loving You Is Wrong, created, produced and written by Tyler Perry. In 2018, she was cast in the CW series, Roswell, New Mexico.

Filmography

Film

Television

References

External links

Living people
21st-century American actresses
Actresses from Maine
African-American actresses
American film actresses
American film producers
American television actresses
American women film directors
People from Waldo County, Maine
Film directors from Maine
American women film producers
21st-century African-American women
21st-century African-American people
20th-century African-American people
Year of birth missing (living people)
20th-century African-American women